The 1993–94 Northern Premier League season was the 26th in the history of the Northern Premier League, a football competition in England. Teams were divided into two divisions; the Premier and the First. It was known as the HFS Loans League for sponsorship reasons.

Premier Division 

The Premier Division featured three new teams:

 Boston United relegated from the Football Conference
 Bridlington Town promoted as champions of Division One
 Knowsley United promoted as runners-up of Division One

League table

Results

Division One 

Division One featured four new teams:

 Bamber Bridge promoted as runners-up from the NWCFL Division One
 Goole Town relegated from the Premier Division
 Mossley relegated from the Premier Division
 Spennymoor United promoted as champions from the NCEFL Premier Division

League table

Promotion and relegation 

In the twenty-sixth season of the Northern Premier League Marine should have been (as champions) automatically promoted to the Football Conference, but were not as they did not meet the Conference's requirements. Bridlington Town folded at the end of the season, meaning only Fleetwood were relegated to the First Division, while Leek Town moved to the Southern League Premier Division; these three clubs were replaced by relegated Conference side Witton Albion, First Division winners Guiseley and second placed Spennymoor United. Meanwhile, Blyth Spartans and Atherton Laburnum Rovers were admitted into the First Division.

Cup Results
Challenge Cup:

Spennymoor United bt. Hyde United

President's Cup:

Guiseley bt. Leek Town

Northern Premier League Shield: Between Champions of NPL Premier Division and Winners of the Presidents Cup.

Marine bt. Guiseley

References

External links 
 Northern Premier League Tables at RSSSF

Northern Premier League seasons
6